The 2021 Rockhampton Region mayoral by-election was held on Saturday 23 January 2021.

The election was triggered by the resignation of long-serving mayor Margaret Strelow who resigned on 9 November 2020 after the Councillor Conduct Tribunal found that she had engaged in misconduct after failing to update her Register of Interests to include a hospitality benefit after participating in a trade mission to India in 2017.

Her resignation came just seven months after she had been re-elected as mayor of Rockhampton Regional Council at the 2020 Queensland quadrennial local government elections on 28 March 2020, where she was elected with 68.85% of the vote ahead of her only competitor, anti-mining environmentalist Chris "Pineapple" Hooper who achieved 31.15% of the vote.

Strelow's resignation and the assumption that Hooper would be her successor by default, arising from legislation changes in state parliament, which was quickly changed back to ensure a by-election would be held, attracted considerable national media coverage.

With a record field of 17 candidates, the by-election itself also attracted considerable media interest.

Background

Strelow
After being elected to Rockhampton City Council in 1997, Margaret Strelow was first elected as the city's mayor in 2000, beating incumbent mayor Jim McRae, former mayor Lea Taylor and local butcher Trevor Heyes.

Her election saw her become the first female mayor of the city.

Strelow was once again elected mayor of the city council in 2004, beating councillor Jim Rundle.

Her second term as mayor also saw her serve as the final mayor of Rockhampton City Council prior to it being disbanded in 2008 and amalgamated into the new, larger Rockhampton Regional Council which also encompassed the former Mount Morgan, Fitzroy and Livingstone Shires.

Strelow did not contest the 2008 local government elections which saw public servant Brad Carter, who she endorsed, become the inaugural mayor of the new Rockhampton Regional Council.

However, after animosity developed between Carter and Strelow, she returned to run against Carter as well as three other candidates, former mayor Lea Taylor, engineer Tim Griffin and businessman Dominic Doblo.

Securing almost 33% of the vote, Strelow was elected as the Rockhampton Region's second mayor, narrowly beating Griffin who garnered just over 26% of the vote.

Her first term as a Rockhampton Region mayor saw her facing a strong de-amalgamation push from the former Livingstone Shire which saw that local government area successfully re-established on 1 January 2014 following a referendum in March 2013.

During this time, her predecessor Brad Carter called for Strelow to be sacked, believing the community had lost faith in her leadership throughout Livingstone's push for de-amalgamation from Rockhampton.

However, Strelow was again re-elected as mayor in 2016 despite being challenged with a strong mayoral campaign from local businessman Michael McMillan who assembled his own "Team McMillan", with candidates in each local division. Her other opponents included former mayor Lea Taylor, former WIN News presenter Bruce Diamond and local businessman Dominic Doblo.  Before she had officially declared victory, Queensland premier Annastacia Palaszczuk contacted Strelow to offer her congratulations.

The relationship between Palaszczuk and Strelow would be tested the following year when Strelow, as a member of the Labor Party, attempted to gain pre-selection to run as the Labor candidate in the 2017 Queensland state election in a bid to replace retiring Rockhampton MP Bill Byrne.

Although she had the support of Palaszczuk, Strelow was blocked by Labor's old guard who had initially selected Dan Coxen as their preferred candidate. After Coxen was deemed ineligible, the party instead endorsed Barry O'Rourke.

Following her failure in getting pre-selection, Strelow left the Australian Labor Party and instead ran in the election as an independent candidate, temporarily standing aside as mayor during the election campaign. However, after O'Rourke was elected, Strelow resumed her mayoral position.

Strelow was again elected mayor at the 2020 local government elections, this time with a commanding victory facing just one opponent, Chris "Pineapple" Hooper.

Hooper
Chris "Pineapple" Hooper was born in Rockhampton and grew up in the suburb of Wandal graduating from Christian Brothers College in 1969.

After school, he worked in the banking sector and then on the railway as a train driver and fireman.

From 1984 until 2006, he owned an organic farming property between Rockhampton and Emu Park which was dubbed "The Funny Farm" where he employed backpackers to work.

After selling the property in 2006, Hooper travelling around Australia before returning to Rockhampton and becoming involved in peace rallies and demonstrations against Exercise Talisman Sabre and Adani Group. In 2011, he established the "Havachat" artists collective store in Rockhampton City.

According to Hooper, he was once arrested for burning a French flag outside a police station, and refuses to drive.

Hooper's first attempt at entering politics was when he ran as an independent candidate for Keppel in the 1992 Queensland state election, in which he obtained 517 votes (2.3%).

He also ran as an independent candidate in the 1995 Queensland state election for the seat of Rockhampton where he obtained 419 votes (2.1%).

Hooper again contested the seat of Rockhampton as an independent at the 2012 Queensland state election, where he obtained 286 votes (1.03%).

In 2016, he changed his focus from state to local elections, running as an independent mayoral candidate in the 2016 local government elections where he garnered 1,618 votes (3.61%).

When he ran as Strelow's only opponent at the local mayoral elections in 2020, he achieved his most successful result, picking up 12,133 votes, equating to over 30% of the vote.

State government legislation changes
Following the 2020 local government elections, it came to light that the Queensland Government had passed an Electoral and Other Legislation Bill which effectively changed local government legislation so that in the event a mayor should resign or become incapacitated within twelve months following an election, a by-election would not be required.  It meant that the person with the second highest votes at the preceding mayoral election would instead become the mayor by default.

Strelow strongly objected to this change, as did Gladstone Region mayor Matt Burnett and Shadow Minister for Local Government, Ann Leahy.  Leahy said that a runner-up filling the vacancy after an election was a "significant departure from the existing legislation" and pondered how appointing a runner-up could be a reflection of the electorate's wishes if, hypothetically, they had won just 11% of the vote but the departing mayor had managed to win with 80% of the vote.

In defence of the bill, Local Government Minister Stirling Hinchliffe said the changes were to discourage newly elected mayors and councillors from leaving office to which they had just been elected to, particularly when local and state elections were held just seven months apart every four years, and was also in response to concerns raised by councils about the expense of by-elections.

Strelow continued to complain about the legislation changes as 2020 progressed.

Prior to her resignation, Strelow attracted media attention after she posted a video of herself covered in bubble wrap on Facebook to illustrate how cautious she was being, fearing that something may happen to her which could see Hooper become mayor.

Councillor Conduct Tribunal findings
In November 2020, the Councillor Conduct Tribunal found Strelow to have engaged in misconduct after she had failed to update her Register of Interests to include a hospitality benefit from mining company Adani following an official trip to India with other dignitaries including Queensland premier Annastacia Palaszczuk and other mayors from Queensland in 2017.

Adani had paid for flights and for a dinner, totalling $1,670 per person.

The Department of Local Government wrote to Rockhampton Regional Council's chief executive officer in June 2018, advising that the hospitality provided by Adani needed to be listed on Strelow's Register of Interests, which Strelow failed to do despite updating the register with other items three times after the CEO received the letter.

The Office of Independent Assessments wrote to the council's CEO again in June 2019 requesting action be taken.  But after Strelow failed to mention Adani's hospitality from the India trip, they handed down a decision on 2 June 2020, finding Strelow to have engaged to misconduct, ordering her to apologise, make the necessary changes to her Register of Interests and then undergo training.

Strelow's resignation
Strelow announced her resignation on 9 November 2020.

In an address on her Facebook page, Strelow said her refusal to agree that she had been compromised by the visit to India was a matter of personal integrity and said she could not agree that a reasonable person would have believed she had been compromised.  She also added that she had acted in accordance with her own conscience and on the advice of senior legal practitioners and officers from the Department of Local Government.

Her resignation prompted a series of tributes from local Central Queensland community and business leaders including from the Capricornia Chamber of Commerce, Regional Development Australia, SMW Group and Bravus.

Despite deputy mayor Neil Fisher being appointed as the acting mayor of Rockhampton Regional 
Council in Strelow's absence, there was confusion as to who Strelow's successor would be.

With the well-publicised changes to the local government legislation in state parliament, some local media outlets assumed that as runner-up in the mayoral election held earlier in the year, Chris "Pineapple" Hooper had essentially become the mayor-elect by default, which prompted a slew of national media stories about the unusual situation.

However, soon after Strelow's resignation, Local Government Minister Stirling Hinchliffe announced that a new bill would be introduced and swiftly passed through state parliament to amend the legislation, retrospectively reverting it back to ensure a by-election would be held.

According to Hinchcliffe, the move would ensure communities, including those in the Rockhampton Region, could democratically vote to determine who best represents them.

This angered Hooper who believed he was the legitimate mayor according to the amended legislation, and who had formally accepted the Electoral Commission of Queensland's offer of becoming mayor.

He attempted to enter a council meeting at City Hall to be sworn in as mayor after accepting the offer, but was prevented from doing so.

Mayoral by-election
A by-election was subsequently called for Saturday 23 January 2021.

It was Rockhampton's first mayoral by-election since 31 October 1953, which was held following the resignation of mayor Rex Pilbeam, who had been elected to office the previous year. Pilbeam resigned after finding himself embroiled in a public scandal after suffering a serious gunshot wound when an attempt was made on his life by his mistress, who attempted to murder him on 8 June 1953. In that instance, Pilbeam stood in the ensuing by-election where he was re-elected.  He went on to serve as the mayor of Rockhampton City Council for thirty years until he was defeated in 1982, while also concurrently serving as the state MP for Rockhampton South from 1960 until 1969.

With Strelow out of contention, a slew of candidates nominated in an attempt to fill the mayoral vacancy.

A record total of 17 candidates contested the mayoral by-election, including Hooper and four sitting councillors, Tony Williams (Division 3), Cherie Rutherford (Division 5), Donna Kirkland (Division 7) and Shane Latcham (Division 1).

Other contenders were urban strategist Russell Claus, mine worker Bronwyn Laverty-Young, driving instructor Leyland Barnett, logistics specialist Christian Shepherd, fruit and vegetable retailer Dominic Doblo, Sir Graham McCamley's grandson Remy McCamley, sports administrator Rob Crowe, camera operator Christopher Davies, pastor John Rewald, Bulloo Shire finance manager Brett Williams, teacher Miranda Broadbent and business strategist Nyree Johnson.

Prior to the by-election, Williams, Barnett and Shepherd declared they were members of Australian Labor Party, the Liberal National Party of Queensland and Katter's Australian Party respectively, with the remainder of the candidates claiming they were independent from any political affiliation.  Shepherd had previously run as the local Rockhampton KAP candidate in the 2020 Queensland state election. Doblo had also contested the same election as an independent candidate.

There was criticism that with so many candidates it became confusing for local voters.

There was also criticism that most of the candidates had focused their campaigns squarely on issues directly affecting the city of Rockhampton, and therefore ignoring and neglecting important issues affecting rural communities within the Rockhampton Region such as Bajool.

Results
The by-election was won by Tony Williams.

Williams is a former meatworker and a long-serving councillor who had served in both Rockhampton City Council from 2004 to 2008 and Rockhampton Regional Council from 2008. From 2012 until 2016, he had also served as deputy mayor.

He had been elected unopposed to Division 3 at the previous local election.

Winning 24.82% of the first preference vote, Williams was declared the new mayor of Rockhampton Regional Council on 4 February 2021.

After the distribution of preferences, Williams had a percentage of 58.76% of the vote, in front of his nearest rival, urban strategist Russell Claus who secured 41.24% of the vote, after preferences.

Division 3 by-election
Due to Williams being elected as mayor, another by-election was called to fill his vacancy in Division 3.

The Division 3 by-election was held on 13 March 2021 with five candidates vying to be elected as Williams' successor.

Results
The Division 3 by-election was won by Grant Mathers, a former sales and corporate events manager who had worked as the site manager at Beef Australia in 2015.

He is also the brother of sitting Division 5 councillor Cherie Rutherford.

References 

Elections in Queensland
Mayoral elections in Australia